Virt Records is an independent record label based in Seattle, USA.
 
Virt artists are primarily singer/songwriters.

Artists signed to Virt Records
Current
Ellery
The Bittersweets
Shane Nicholson
Brenda Weiler
Beth Boucher
Rachel Gaudry

Former
Vienna Teng

See also
 List of record labels

External links
 Website

American independent record labels
Pop record labels